Darling Hill is a mountain located in Central New York Region of New York west of Westford, New York.

References

Mountains of Otsego County, New York
Mountains of New York (state)